The 1975 Phillip Island 500K was an endurance race for Touring Cars complying with CAMS Group C regulations. The event was held at the Phillip Island circuit in Victoria, Australia on 23 November 1975.  Race distance was 106 laps of the 4.73 km circuit for a race distance of 501 km.

There were 48 starters in the event, which event was the fifth and final round of the 1975 Australian Manufacturers' Championship.

The race was won by Peter Brock driving for the Gown-Hindhaugh team continuing a run of good results since Brock had left the Holden Dealer Team the previous year. Brock took a four lap win over fellow Holden Torana racer Allan Grice. Attrition bit heavily into a field low on strength in the faster cars that competed at other Australian Manufacturers' Championship events, to the point that a well driven race by the Ford Escort RS2000 of Jim Murcott and Rod Stevens brought them third place, five laps behind Brock.

Class structure
The field was divided into four engine capacity classes:		
 Class A: Up to 1300cc		
 Class B: 1301–2000cc		
 Class C: 2001 – 3000cc		
 Class D: 3001 – 6000cc

Results

References 	

 Australian Competition Yearbook, 1976 Edition		
 Racing Car News, January 1976		
 The Australian Racing History of Ford, © 1989		
 The Official Racing History of Holden, © 1988

Phillip Island 500
Phillip Island
Motorsport at Phillip Island
November 1975 sports events in Australia